Palaeobranchiostoma hamatotergum is an extinct cephalochordate from the Early Permian-aged Whitehill Formation in South Africa.  It is known from a single, 11 mm long specimen found in black shale.

See also
Pikaia 
Cathaymyrus

References

Permian animals of Africa
Cephalochordata
Prehistoric chordate genera